Kyu Kyu Hla (born 13 April 1954) is a retired Burmese educator that served as lecturer at the Myanmar language department of Yangon University. She is the wife of Senior General Min Aung Hlaing, the 12th prime minister of Myanmar. She became Spouse of the Prime Minister of Myanmar following her husband's transition to Prime Minister on 1 August 2021, whereupon he has ruled the nation as Chairman of the State Administration Council after the 2021 Myanmar coup d'état. She is also the honorary patron of Myanmar Women's Affairs.

Biography
She is nicknamed "Amay Kyu" (Mother Kyu) by military communities. She regularly accompanies her husband as a member of military delegations to foreign countries. 

In February 2020, Kyu Kyu Hla and her husband Min Aung Hlaing together placed the "Hti" umbrella on top Bagan's most powerful ancient Htilominlo Temple. The meaning of the temple name is "need the royal umbrella, need the King". Many people believed that the ceremony was a yadaya and seeking divine blessings for her husband's glory.

Kyu Kyu Hla became a major target of a domestic boycott and social punishment by people who oppose the military regime when her husband seized power from a democratically elected government and whose regime has killed nearly 2,000 anti-coup protesters.

On 22 February 2021, detained government economic policy advisor Sean Turnell's wife, Ha Vu, an Australian-Vietnamese academic, wrote a letter to Kyu Kyu Hla appealing "wife to wife" for her husband’s release.

The U.S. Department of the Treasury has imposed sanctions on her since 2 July 2021, pursuant to Executive Order 14014, in response to the Burmese military's coup against the democratically elected civilian government of Myanmar. The sanctions include freezing of assets under the US and a ban on transactions with US persons.

She was highly public criticized on 29 November 2021 when junta-controlled media reported that Kyu Kyu Hla led families from the Office of the Commander-in-Chief of Defense Services to chant Paṭṭhāna, the seventh text of the Theravada Buddhism philosophy, to pray for peace and for Myanmar to overcome catastrophes. At that event, she was seated in a cushioned chair in the center of the hall while the wives of military personnel sat on the floor. A chair is commonly used as a metaphor for power in Myanmar politics, prompting many comments on social media such as, "Not only the husband, but also Kyu Kyu Hla craves a chair." 

Kyu Kyu Hla has been writing pro-military articles and poems in anniversary editions of military magazines under the pen name of Thiri Pyae Sone May (Myanmarsar). She wrote a poem commemorating the 75th anniversary of the Air Force, "To Diamond Jubilee Air Force", that was featured in the state-controlled newspapers. The poem praised the Myanmar Air Force, which has carried out numerous lethal air raids on civilian and non-military targets in Hpakant, also known as the Hpakant massacre. 

During the military council meeting on February 13, 2022, Min Aung Hlaing praised to his wife Kyu Kyu Hla as "a teacher who had made significant sacrifices".

References 

Burmese educators
1954 births
Living people
Spouses of prime ministers of Myanmar
Spouses of national leaders
People from Rakhine State
Individuals related to Myanmar sanctions